Urophora aprica is a species of tephritid or fruit flies in the genus Urophora of the family Tephritidae.

Distribution
Belgium, Sweden and Finland, south to north Italy, Bulgaria and Caucasus.

References

Urophora
Insects described in 1814
Diptera of Europe
Taxa named by Carl Fredrik Fallén